The Wake of Calum MacLeod is a Canadian drama short film, directed by Marc Almon and released in 2006. The first film ever made in the Canadian dialect of the Scottish Gaelic language, the film stars Angus MacLeod as the titular Calum MacLeod, a father in Cape Breton who is at risk of losing his family because his insistence on the traditional ways conflicts with their preference for fitting into the modern world.

The film received a Genie Award nomination for Best Live Action Short Drama at the 28th Genie Awards. It later won the A&E Short Filmmakers Award at the National Screen Institute's Online Short Film Festival.

References

External links
 The Wake of Calum MacLeod from the National Screen Institute

2006 films
Films shot in Nova Scotia
Films set in Nova Scotia
Canadian drama short films
2000s Canadian films